

Some of the Monuments aux Morts of the Western Somme

The Monuments aux Morts of the Western Somme are French war memorials commemorating those who died in World War I. In the Western part of the Somme region, in the area around Abbeville, there are many such memorials and some of these are identified and described below as are the sculptors, marbriers or foundries who worked on them.

Further images

See also
World War I memorials
War memorials (Aisne)
War memorials (Oise)
War memorials (Eastern Somme)

References

External links 

 Sites of Memory (Historical markers, memorials, monuments, and cemeteries worldwide)
 A National Archives article giving more information on the Butte de Chalmont (see Paul Landowski above)
 Louis-Henri Leclabart -Information on Louis-Henri Leclabart
 Website for Andre Abbal museum in Carbonne Andre Abbal Museum
 Paul Landowski Museum Information on Paul Landowski museum in Paris.
 Source of information on monuments aux morts Paul Landowski Museum 

Sculptures in France
World War I memorials in France

fr:Monument aux morts